Alli Simpson is an Australian singer, actress, radio host, television personality and author. Simpson has 1.2 million followers on Instagram and half a million subscribers on YouTube. She is the younger sister of Australian singer and swimmer Cody Simpson.

Early life
At the age of 12, she and her family moved to the United States so her brother could pursue his music career. While living in the US, Simpson got a job in national radio, released some music and filmed a movie. However, in 2018, she and her family moved back to Australia.

Career
In 2012, Simpson filmed her first movie in the United States, 12 Dogs Of Christmas: Great Puppy Rescue. She appeared as a character name Alli in the TV series Hacking High School in 2017. Her second movie in the US, Death Link, was released in 2021.

In 2013, she released two singles, "Notice Me" and "Why I’m Single", and went on to release more music until 2018. In September 2021, she revealed that she had plans to release more music.

In 2018, Simpson was part of season 2 of the Special Broadcasting Service (SBS) documentary series Filthy Rich and Homeless.

Simpson appeared as a contestant on the seventh season of I’m A Celebrity…Get Me Out Of Here! Australia which premiered in January 2021. She was the third contestant to be eliminated. Later that year, Simpson competed in the third season of The Masked Singer Australia as "Lightning" and made it to the final six.

She presented the Alli Simpson Show on Radio Disney from 2015, becoming the youngest host of a nationally syndicated show in the United States.

In 2020, Simpson co-authored the children's book Clouds: Life's Big & Little Moments with her mother, Angie Simpson.

Personal life
In January 2022, Simpson hit her head in a shallow diving pool. She was sent to a hospital with a fractured neck. This required her to wear a neck brace for the next four months.

Filmography

Discography

References

Australian singers
Living people
Year of birth missing (living people)